Malitbog, officially the Municipality of Malitbog, is a 4th class municipality in the province of Southern Leyte, Philippines. According to the 2020 census, it has a population of 23,256 people.

History 

The town of Malitbog, Southern Leyte came into existence in the early part of the 18th century as proven from the inscriptions on the stone walls of the ruins of the watchtowers "Baluarte" located equidistant from the Roman Catholic Church. One is found south of the Poblacion in Barangay Caaga and the other in Barangay Abgao north of the Poblacion. Said watchtowers were constructed in the year 1820. The two barangays abovementioned were ruled by their chieftains, called capitanes. No traces could be found as to the names of the capitanes. As absolute rulers of their respective barangays, they tried to established their own kingdoms. Both of the chieftains wanted to rule the other, hence, there was strong and keen rivalry between the two and the pueblo was to be organized by the Spaniards sometimes in the middle part of the 18th century. The inhabitants were very much confused as to where the pueblo be located. Confusion in the local dialect means "makalibog". Since that time the Spaniards organized the pueblo, they called it Malitbog, a derivative or distorted word from the dialect "makalibog". They built the Town Center midway and equidistant between the two Barrios.

Through the intercession of the Roman Catholic Priest who often visited the two warring barangays, a proposal was made to the rival barangays to fuse the two communities and establish a bigger church. Again, trouble arose as to where the church be constructed. A settlement was later on made through the insinuation of the priest that the church be built not in any of the two barangays but in a location that shall serve as boundaries between them. In 1857, the Roman Catholic Church was built up in baroque architecture by forced labor. And in addition to the construction starting from the very portal of the church leading to the shoreline, going east to serve as the demarcation line between the two rival barangays, at the end of the dividing line a watchtower was constructed. This watchtower was constructed in the year 1862 as inscribed in the walls of the said watchtower. The town of Malitbog was created on December 14, 1849, and was later on reorganized under the provisions of the Maura Law of 1893 the territorial limits covered nineteen (19) kilometers to the south of the Poblacion including the island of Limasawa.

In 1897, a one-storey building in baroque style was constructed at the left side of the demarcation line also equidistant from the Catholic Church and the watchtower. The said building was believed to be the seat of government during the Spanish Regime. No traces could be found as to the name of the first governadorcillo, though at a later time prior to the Spanish–American War, there were capitanes known in the locality by the name of Capitan Tonio Base and Capitan Esteban Piramide. During the American Regime, the town was reorganized under the provision of Act. No. 82 passed by the Second Philippine Commission in 1900. This Act was known as the Municipal Code and the First Municipal President of Malitbog was Francisco Escaño. A house owned by a certain Macabuhay located at the corner of Calle Real and a street now known as Lopez Jaena served as the Municipal Hall and was later transferred to another private house owned by a certain Chinese merchant at the corner of Calle Real and a street now known as Mayor Vaño Street.

The American Regime in the early 1900 was marked with the establishment of public elementary schools. One of the school buildings was constructed near the old building built in baroque style during the Spanish era. This old building was later on made into a Municipal Hall. When the enrolment in the school increased, the newly constructed house could no longer accommodate until the local government came into agreement with the school authorities to exchange places. And so the Municipal Hall was transferred for the fourth time to the public school building until at present which remain to the seat of the Local Government Unit of Malitbog. In 1957 during the incumbency of President Carlos P. Garcia, several barrios in the southern portion of Malitbog including the island of Limasawa was created into a separate town as the municipality of Padre Burgos by virtue of an Executive Order No. 265. Fourteen (14) years later, the northern portion of Malitbog was declared into another town known as the municipality of Tomas Oppus, previously known as Santiago through the Act of Congress No. 5777 and further amended by Presidential Decree No. 134. Presently, the municipality has 37 barangays; 21 of which are coastal, 4 are inland and 12 are mountain barangays.

Geography
The municipality of Malitbog is located in the southern region of the island of Leyte, one of the major islands in the Philippines. It is officially designated as part of Region VIII, or Southern Leyte. It is situated along the coast of Sogod Bay and is bounded on the north-west by the municipalities of Macrohon and Maasin City, the capital town of the province of Southern Leyte, on the north-east by the municipality of Tomas Oppus and on the south by the municipality of Padre Burgos. It can be reached by bus and other public utility vehicles and privately owned ones with a travel time of 40 minutes to one 1 hour to and from Maasin City, and 30–40 minutes to Sogod. It takes about 2–4 hours to and from Malitbog to Tacloban City.

Barangays
Malitbog is politically subdivided into 37 barangays.

Climate

Demographics

Economy

Notable personalities

Ruperto Kangleon
Iliff David Richardson

References

External links

 Malitbog Profile at PhilAtlas.com
 [ Philippine Standard Geographic Code]
Philippine Census Information
Local Governance Performance Management System

Municipalities of Southern Leyte